Garupá is a village and municipality in Misiones Province in north-eastern Argentina. It takes part of the Great Posadas (urban agglomerated between Posadas and Garupá), and most of the population works in the provincial capital.

References

Populated places in Misiones Province